Phyllanthus is the largest genus in the plant family Phyllanthaceae. Estimates of the number of species in this genus vary widely, from 750 to 1200. Phyllanthus has a remarkable diversity of growth forms including annual and perennial herbs, shrubs, climbers, floating aquatics, and pachycaulous succulents. Some have flattened leaflike stems called cladodes. It has a wide variety of floral morphologies and chromosome numbers and has one of the widest range of pollen types of any seed plant genus.

Despite their variety, almost all Phyllanthus species express a specific type of growth called "phyllanthoid branching" in which the vertical stems bear deciduous, floriferous (flower-bearing), plagiotropic (horizontal or oblique) stems. The leaves on the main (vertical) axes are reduced to scales called "cataphylls", while leaves on the other axes develop normally.  Phyllanthus is distributed in all tropical and subtropical regions on Earth.

Phyllanthus was first described by Carl Linnaeus in 1753, but the type was not designated.

Species

The circumscription of this genus has been a cause of much confusion and disagreement. Molecular phylogenetic studies have shown that Phyllanthus is paraphyletic over Reverchonia, Glochidion, Sauropus, and Breynia. A recent revision of the family Phyllanthaceae has subsumed all four of these genera into Phyllanthus. This enlarged version of Phyllanthus might eventually be divided into smaller genera, including 32 Chinese (and northern Indochinese) species. A complete overhaul of the genus, including a new classification is currently underway, following a recent indepth molecular treatment of major groups included. 

Selected species:

 Phyllanthus abnormis Baill. – Drummond's leafflower
 Phyllanthus acidus (L.) Skeels – Otaheite gooseberry
 Phyllanthus acuminatus Vahl – Jamaican gooseberry tree
 Phyllanthus amarus Schumacher
 Phyllanthus anamalayanus (Gamble) G.L.Webster
 Phyllanthus angustifolius (Sw.) Sw.
 Phyllanthus arbuscula (Sw.) J.F.Gmel.
 Phyllanthus axillaris (Sw.) Müll.Arg.
 Phyllanthus brasiliensis (Aubl.) Poir.
 Phyllanthus caesiifolius Petra Hoffm. & Cheek
 Phyllanthus caroliniensis Walt. – native to the Americas
 Phyllanthus cauliflorus (Sw.) Griseb.
 Phyllanthus cladanthus Müll.Arg.
 Phyllanthus cochinchinensis (Lour.) Spreng.
 Phyllanthus coluteoides Baill. ex Müll.Arg.
 Phyllanthus cuneifolius (Britt.) Croizat
 Phyllanthus debilis Klein ex Willd.
 Phyllanthus distichus Hook. & Arn.
 Phyllanthus emblica L. – Indian gooseberry, also known as amla or amalaki.
 Phyllanthus engleri Pax
 Phyllanthus epiphyllanthus L.
 Phyllanthus ericoides Torr.
 Phyllanthus eximius G.L.Webster & Proctor
 Phyllanthus fadyenii Urb.
 Phyllanthus fluitans Benth. ex Müll.Arg. – red root floater, sometimes sold in aquarium shops
 Phyllanthus fraternus G.L.Webster
 Phyllanthus gentryi Webster
 Phyllanthus grandifolius L.
 Phyllanthus gunnii Hook.f.
 Phyllanthus hakgalensis
 Phyllanthus hirtellus F.Muell. ex Mull.Arg.               
 Phyllanthus juglandifolius Willd.
 Phyllanthus lacunarius F.Muell.
 Phyllanthus latifolius (L.) Sw.
 Phyllanthus liebmannianus Muell.Arg.
 Phyllanthus maderaspatensis L.
 Phyllanthus microcladus Muell.Arg.
 Phyllanthus millei Standl.
 Phyllanthus mirabilis Müll.Arg. – one of the four succulent species of this genus
 Phyllanthus montanus (Sw.) Sw.
 Phyllanthus myrtifolius (Wight.) Muell.Arg.
 Phyllanthus muellerianus (Kuntze) Exell
 Phyllanthus niruri L. – Chanca piedra (Also includes P. amarus and P. debilis)
 Phyllanthus nyale Petra Hoffm. & Cheek
 Phyllanthus parvifolius Buch.-Ham. ex D.Don
 Phyllanthus pavonianus Baill.
 Phyllanthus pentaphyllus C.Wright ex Griseb.
 Phyllanthus phialanthoides Falcón & J.L.Gómez
 Phyllanthus polygonoides Nutt. ex Spreng. – Smartweed leafflower
 Phyllanthus polyspermus Shumach. & Thonn. – often misidentified as P. reticulatus
 Phyllanthus profusus N.E.Br.
 Phyllanthus pulcher Wallich ex Muell.Arg.
 Phyllanthus reticulatus Poir. – Asian sp. similar in appearance to P. polyspermus
 Phyllanthus revaughanii Coode
 Phyllanthus rufuschaneyi Welzen, R.W.Bouman & Ent
 Phyllanthus saffordii Merr.
 Phyllanthus salviifolius Kunth
 Phyllanthus sepialis Müll.Arg.
 Phyllanthus societatis Müll.Arg.          
 Phyllanthus sponiifolius Müll.Arg.      
 Phyllanthus stipulatus (Raf.) G.L. Webster
 Phyllanthus taxodiifolius Beille
 Phyllanthus tenellus Roxb.
 Phyllanthus urinaria L. – chamberbitter
 Phyllanthus virgatus G.Forst.
 Phyllanthus warnockii G.L.Webster
 Phyllanthus watsonii Airy Shaw
 Phyllanthus welwitschianus Müll.Arg.

Fossil record	
Two fossil seeds of a Phyllanthus species have been extracted from borehole samples of the Middle Miocene fresh water deposits in Nowy Sacz Basin, West Carpathians, Poland. The seeds are similar to seeds of the fossil species †Phyllanthus triquetra and †Phyllanthus compassica from the Oligocene and Miocene of West Siberia. Phyllanthus fossils are known from several Miocene and Pliocene sites in Poland.

Pollination biology

Phyllanthus are of note in the fields of pollination biology and coevolution because some but not all species in the genus have a specialized mutualism with moths in the genus Epicephala (leafflower moths), in which the moths actively pollinate the flowers. While ensuring that the tree may produce viable seeds, the moths also lay eggs in the flowers' ovaries where their larvae consume a subset of the developing seeds as nourishment. Other species of Epicephala are pollinators of certain species of plants in the genera Glochidion and Breynia, both of which are phylogenetically nested within Phyllanthus.

Research and traditional medicine

Particularly for its content of tannins, P. emblica fruit has a history of use in traditional medicine and is under study for its potential biological properties. Leaves, roots, stem, bark and berries of this genus contain lignans and other phytochemicals.

References

 
Phyllanthaceae genera
Taxa named by Carl Linnaeus
Taxa described in 1753